Alan Michael Garber (born 1955) is an American physician, health economist, and academic administrator. He is the Provost of Harvard University.

Early life and education
Garber was born in 1955. He graduated from Harvard College in 1976 with an AB in economics and stayed at Harvard to earn an AM and a PhD in economics. While pursuing his PhD, he enrolled simultaneously at Stanford University, where he received an MD degree in 1983.

Career
Garber succeeded Steven Hyman as the provost of Harvard University on September 1, 2011.

Garber is also the Mallinckrodt Professor of Health Care Policy at Harvard Medical School, Professor of Economics in the Harvard Faculty of Arts and Sciences, Professor of Public Policy in the John F. Kennedy School of Government, and Professor in the Department of Health Policy and Management in the Harvard T.H. Chan School of Public Health.

Graduate student unionization controversy
In July 2016, Harvard University's Office of the Provost launched a web page in response to its graduate students' efforts to unionize. On August 23, 2016, following the Columbia decision which restored union rights to teaching and research assistants, the Provost's office wrote in an email to students, "we continue to believe that the relationship between students and the University is primarily about education, and that unionization will disrupt academic programs and freedoms, mentoring, and research at Harvard." Following a decision by the Regional Director of the National Labor Relations Board that Harvard was in violation of the Excelsior rule, Garber has defended the university's appeal to the National Labor Relations Board in Washington, D.C., writing that the university "believes that the November 2016 election results, which reflect the votes and voices of well-informed students, should stand, and has appealed the Regional Director's decision to the contrary."

On December 3, 2019, Harvard's graduate student union began striking on Harvard's campus due to the university's opposition to contractual changes. The union's proposed changes include pay increases based on rising living-costs, expanded healthcare coverage for dependents, improved mental health services benefits, as well as third-party oversight of sexual harassment and assault cases.

Pharmaceutical board memberships
In October 2019, The Harvard Crimson reported that Garber collected more than $2.7 million serving on the board of directors for Exelixis and Vertex Pharmaceuticals since being appointed as Harvard's Provost in 2011, according to SEC filings. The companies indicated that his compensation was normal for board members. Garber states that he has thoroughly disclosed his industry affiliations in conflict of interest forms for the university.

Personal life
Garber has a wife, Anne Yahanda, and four children.

References

1955 births
Living people
Harvard College alumni
Harvard Graduate School of Arts and Sciences alumni
Stanford University School of Medicine alumni
Harvard University faculty
Health economists
Members of the National Academy of Medicine